Speed skiing world records are the highest speeds reached in the different categories of this sport.

Organization 
These records have been registered in the official competitions organized by the different federations which have managed this sport at a mondial level, across the time (ISS, FISV, FIS, ...). Today, all the races are supervised by the International Ski Federation (FIS). Nevertheless, this federation doesn't publish any record.

Speed skiing is performed in two principal categories :
 Speed One (S1), the best class, performed with specific speed skiing equipment
S2, the second class, performed with standard alpine skiing equipment (also called Production then Speed Downhil (SDH))

Records are existing for theses 2 categories, and also for age sub-categories (Juniors U21 : under 21 years old, ...)

These records have been established on the quickest tracks of each time. In 2022, the quickest active track is Chabrières in Vars (France). Furthermore, one specific race (Speedmasters) is organized every year for permitting skiers to approach these records, at the period where the track is the quicker (end of March).

Otherwise, other speed sports use skis : monoski, snowboard, telemark, ski bob, snowscoot. Their Speed records are also established on the same tracks.

Current records

Men

Women

S1 record history

Men

Women

S1 best performers of all times

Men

Women

References

Skiing world competitions
Sports world records